Pseudoleskeella is a genus of mosses belonging to the family Leskeaceae.

The species of this genus are found predominantly in Northern Hemisphere.

Species:
 Pseudoleskeella catenulata Kindberg, 1897
 Pseudoleskeella denticulata (Sull.) Kindb.

References

Hypnales
Moss genera